David Estlund is the Lombardo Family Professor of Philosophy at Brown University, where he has taught since 1991.  He works primarily in political philosophy.

Education and career

Estlund earned his Ph.D. in philosophy from the University of Wisconsin, Madison, and taught briefly at the University of California, Irvine, before moving to Brown.  He has spent fellowship years at the Program in Ethics at Harvard University and at Australian National University. His research interests center on liberalism, justice, and especially democracy. He sits on the editorial board of the academic journal Representation. He is editor of the collection, Democracy (Blackwell, 2002) and the author of Democratic Authority: A Philosophical Framework (Princeton, 2008) and Utopophobia. On The Limits (If Any) Of Political Philosophy, (Princeton University Press, 2019).

References

External links 
David Estlund's Brown University Research Page

21st-century American philosophers
Brown University faculty
Living people
Political philosophers
Year of birth missing (living people)